Stan Brooks may refer to:

 Stanley Brooks, American film and television producer
 Stan Brooks (radio broadcaster) (1927–2013), American radio broadcaster
 Stan Brookes (born 1953), English footballer